Soon Lip Chee is a Malaysian politician and currently serves as Penang State Executive Councillor.

Election results

References 

Living people
People from Penang
Malaysian people of Chinese descent
Democratic Action Party (Malaysia) politicians
21st-century Malaysian politicians
Members of the Penang State Legislative Assembly
Penang state executive councillors
1977 births